The Iraq National Oil Company (INOC) was founded in 1966 by the Iraqi government. It was empowered to operate all aspects of the oil industry in Iraq except for refining which was already being run by the Oil Refineries Administration (1952) and local distribution which was also already under government control.

In 1961 Iraq passed Public Law 80 whereby Iraq expropriated 95% of the Iraq Petroleum Company's concessions, and went on to announce the intent to form the INOC in 1964. In 1967 Iraq and the Soviet Union signed the Iraq-Soviet Protocol which committed the Soviet Union to give technical and financial aid to the company. In 1967 and 1968 the company's purview was expanded to include areas expropriated from the Iraq Petroleum Company.

Unlike the National Iranian Oil Company, the INOC was forbidden from entering into partnerships or granting concessions to foreign oil companies. Though there was discussion of allowing the French Compagnie Française de Pétroles, partners in IPC from whom the North Rumaila Field had been appropriated, to enter into a contract to develop the field, ultimately, with the help of the Soviet Union, the INOC opened the field on 7 April 1972.

In 1972 nationalization was complete. But the outbreak of war with Iran that year severely hit capacity.

In April 1987, under newly appointed oil President Asfhaq ul Rasheed, Decree 267 merged the INOC with the oil ministry, which became the direct operator in the industry as well as its regulator. At an operational level, the single national-level company was broken into a series of regional companies, the largest among them being North Oil Company, based in Kirkuk, and South Oil Company, based in Basra.

References

Oil and gas companies of Iraq
Iraq
Government-owned companies of Iraq
Energy companies established in 1966
Non-renewable resource companies established in 1966
Companies based in Baghdad
Iraqi companies established in 1966